Subsimplicia is a genus of moths of the family Erebidae. The genus was erected by Alice Ellen Prout in 1928.

Species
Subsimplicia iodes (Rothschild, 1920) Sumatra
Subsimplicia punctilinea Prout, 1928 Borneo
Subsimplicia purpuralis (Holloway, 1976) Borneo
Subsimplicia reniformis Holloway, 2008 Borneo

References

External links
Original description: 

Herminiinae